Paliolla is a genus of sea slugs, dorid nudibranchs, shell-less marine gastropod molluscs in the family Polyceridae.

Species 
Species in the genus Paliolla include:
 Paliolla cooki (Angas, 1864)
 Paliolla templadoi (Ortea, 1989)

References

Polyceridae